Need-fire, or Wild-fire is a term used in folklore to denote a superstition which has survived in the Scottish Highlands until recently.

Like the fire-churning still customary in India for kindling the sacrificial fire, the need- or wild-fire is made by the friction of one piece of wood on another, or of a rope upon a stake. Need-fire is a practice of shepherd peoples to ward off disease from their herds and flocks. It is kindled on occasions of special distress, particularly at the outbreak of a murrain, and the cattle are driven through it. Its efficacy is believed to depend on all other fires being extinguished.

In one case, the kindling of the need-fire in a village near Quedlinburg was impeded by a night light burning in the parsonage. In another account, in the Highlands of Scotland the rule that all common fires must be previously extinguished applied only to the houses situated between the two nearest running streams.

In Bulgaria even smoking during need-fire is forbidden. Two naked men produce the fire by rubbing dry branches together in the forest, and with the flame they light two fires, one on each side of a cross-road haunted by wolves. The cattle are then driven between the two fires, from which glowing embers are taken to rekindle the cold hearths in the houses.

In Caithness the men who kindled the need-fire had previously to divest themselves of all metal. In some of the Hebrides the men who made the fire had to be eighty-one in number and all married. In the Halberstadt district in Germany, the rope which was wound round the stake, must be pulled by two chaste boys; while at Wolfenbüttel, contrary to usual custom, it is said that the need-fire had to be struck out of the cold anvil by the smith. In England the need-fire is said to have been lit at Birtley within the last half of the 18th century. The superstition has its origin in ideas about the purifying nature of flame.

See also

Force-fire
Easter Fire
Badnjak (Croatian)
Badnjak (Serbian)
Pyre

References

Authorities
Jacob Grimm, Deutsche Mythologie, i. 50, sqq.
Walter Keating Kelly, Curiosities of Indo-European Tradition and Folklore, p. 48 sqq.
Charles Isaac Elton, Origins of English History, p. 293 sqq.
James George Frazer, The Golden Bough, iii. 301.

Superstitions
Traditions involving fire